Judith Mary Still  (born 1958) is Professor of French and Critical Theory at the University of Nottingham, England.

She has a PhD (1985) from University College, London. Her thesis was The code of beneficence in the works of Jean-Jacques Rousseau : a study of the precariousness of justice in relations between non-equals : with special reference to pudicity.

Her research focuses on the 18th and 20th centuries, and "is informed by feminist and poststructuralist theory (in particular the work of Jacques Derrida, Helene Cixous and Luce Irigaray)".

In 2018 she was elected a Fellow of the British Academy. Commenting on this she said that she hoped to add to the Academy's diversity, as a woman and a critical theorist but also "in that I was first in my family to go to University, supported by a loving single mother and a State that gave me a full and unconditional grant throughout my studies".

 she is President of the Society for French Studies.

Selected publications
Derrida and hospitality: theory and practice (2013,)
Derrida and other animals: the boundaries of the human (2015,)
Enlightenment hospitality: cannibals, harems and adoption  (2011,) 
Feminine economies: thinking against the market in the enlightenment and the late twentieth century (1997,)
Justice and difference in the works of Rousseau: bienfaisance and pudeur (1993,)

References

1958 births
Living people
British women academics
Alumni of University College London
Academics of the University of Nottingham
Critical theorists
Literary critics of French
Fellows of the British Academy